Impatiens platypetala is variable species of perennial Impatiens discovered on the island of Java and widespread throughout Indonesia. It produces the anthocyanin aurantinidin.

References 

platypetala
Flora of Malesia
Plants described in 1846